Selz is a river in Rhineland-Palatinate, Germany.

Selz may also refer to:
 Selz, North Dakota, United States
 Selz, Ukraine, an earlier name of Lymanske
 Selz Abbey, Alsace, France

See also
 Rhein-Selz, a municipality in Mainz-Bingen, Rhineland-Palatinate, Germany
 Salz (disambiguation)
 Selzen, a municipality in Rhineland-Palatinate, Germany
 Seltz (German: Selz), a commune in Bas-Rhin, Alsace, France
 Sulz (disambiguation)
 Sülz (disambiguation)